The 2002 Stockport Metropolitan Borough Council election was held on 2 May 2002 as part of the wider local elections. Twenty-one seats were up for election across every ward in Stockport and it resulted in the Liberal Democrats having a majority of seats on the council. The Liberal Democrats held this majority until the 2011 local elections.

Results by ward

Bramhall East Ward

References

Stockport
Stockport Metropolitan Borough Council elections